William McKenzie Hastie (7 January 1924 – 14 November 1995)  was a Scottish amateur footballer who made more than 280 appearances in the Scottish League for Queen's Park as a left half. He represented Scotland at amateur level and made one friendly appearance for Great Britain. After his retirement as a player, Hastie became a coach at Queen's Park.

Honours 
Queen's Park
 Scottish League Second Division: 1955–56

References 

1924 births
1995 deaths
Scottish footballers
Scottish Football League players
Association football wing halves
Queen's Park F.C. players
Association football fullbacks
Gala Fairydean Rovers F.C. players
Scotland amateur international footballers
Queen's Park F.C. non-playing staff